Neal Drinnan is an Australian writer. He won the Lambda Literary Award in the Science Fiction, Fantasy or Horror category, and was a nominee in the Gay Fiction category, for his 2006 novel Izzy and Eve at the 19th Lambda Literary Awards.

Originally from Melbourne, Victoria, Drinnan has been primarily based in Sydney and regional Victoria.

He has published six novels and non-fiction travel guides for LGBT tourism in Australia. He was also the editor of Fruit Salad: A Compote of Contemporary Gay & Lesbian Writing, an anthology of Australian LGBT writing published by the Sydney Gay and Lesbian Mardi Gras committee in 1997, and has had several short stories published in anthologies.

Works

Fiction
Glove Puppet (1998)
Pussy's Bow (1999)
Quill (2000)
Izzy and Eve (2006)
Rare Bird of Truth (2010)
Rural Liberties (2017)

Non-fiction
Out in Sydney (1998)
The Rough Guide to Gay and Lesbian Australia (2001)
The Devil's Grip (2019)

References

External links

20th-century Australian novelists
20th-century Australian male writers
21st-century Australian novelists
Australian male short story writers
Australian non-fiction writers
Australian gay writers
Australian LGBT novelists
Writers from Melbourne
Living people
Lambda Literary Award winners
1964 births
Australian male novelists
20th-century Australian short story writers
21st-century Australian short story writers
21st-century Australian male writers
Male non-fiction writers